The Maid of Orleans is a satirical poem by François-Marie Arouet, better known by his pen name, Voltaire. While he had started writing the text in 1730, he never completed it. It was translated into English by W. H. Ireland.

Scandal 
Voltaire was undoubtedly one of the most controversial writers and philosophers of the Enlightenment Age, and The Maid of Orleans was also certainly one of his more contentious works. An epic and scandalous satire concerning the life of the not-yet-canonised Joan of Arc ("the Maid of Orleans"), the poem was outlawed, burned and banned throughout a great portion of Europe during the 18th and the 19th centuries. Containing mockery and satirical commentary on the life and antics of its subject, the poem itself has variously been described as "bawdy" and "licentious".

Despite the often sexist and indecent contents of the text, its notoriety and contraband status made it one of the most widely read texts concerning Joan of Arc for several centuries. Circulating throughout the banned regions by often-surreptitious means, the book was read by a large number of the populace. It was also disseminated by Voltaire himself to some of his colleagues and other members of the upper class, the circle of people and the portion of society for which the text had been specifically intended.

Writing 
Various sources report that Voltaire resolved to write The Maid of Orleans after a literary colleague challenged him to compose a better analysis of the Joan of Arc subject than the treatment Jean Chapelain had produced in his The Maid, or the Heroic Poem of France Delivered. Published in the mid-17th century, Chapelain's poem was a lengthy and philosophical discussion of the topic. While Chapelain's poem was much awaited by followers of his work, it was savaged by critics, and Voltaire made sure to include his own lampoon of Chapelain's work in his own take on Joan of Arc:

After the degree of criticism that the poem received for its sexual undertones and supposedly perverted nature, Voltaire publicly became ashamed of his work and even asserted that the transcript had been somehow corrupted and tainted and so was inauthentic. He published an edited edition of the text over thirty years later, in 1762. The later variant omitted many of the themes and textual content for which the original had been so scorned.

Allusions 
 Alexander Pushkin patterned his Ruslan and Ludmila (1820) after "The Maid of Orleans", one of his favorite books. His last article, "The Last Relative of Jeanne d'Arc" (1837), also concerns Voltaire's poem.
 The poem is referenced repeatedly in Anatole France's 1912 novel The Gods Are Athirst as a favourite work, parts of which can be recited from memory by ordinary French citizens in the 1790s.
 In Gregory Benford's Foundation's Fear (official continuation of Isaac Asimov's Foundation series) appear sims (self-aware simulations) of Voltaire and Joan of Arc. The poem is also mentioned.

References

Sources

External links
La Pucelle d’Orléans (French original)
The Maid of Orleans (English translation)

French poems
Poems published posthumously
Unfinished poems
Works by Voltaire
Works about Joan of Arc
French satirical poems
Mock-heroic poems